Blastogregarinorina is a suborder of parasitic alveolates of the phylum Apicomplexia

Taxonomy

This suborder currently has one family with one genus which contains one species Siedleckia caulleryi. This species is found in marine polychaetes.

History

This suborder was described by Chatton and Villeneuve  in 1936

Description

A mucron is present

Syzygy does not occur.

The gamonts are composed of a single structure without septa: they lack both protomerites and deutomerites.

Anisogamy — unequal sized gamonts — is present. Gamogony occurs with gamonts still attached to intestinal wall. The gametes bud off gamonts. Gametocysts are absent

There is no sporocyst.

The zygote gives rise to 10–16 oocysts.

References

SAR supergroup suborders
Conoidasida